The Lynde and Harry Bradley Foundation, commonly known as the Bradley Foundation, is an American charitable foundation based in Milwaukee, Wisconsin, that primarily supports conservative causes.

The foundation provides between $35 million and $45 million annually to a variety of causes, including cultural institutions, community-based nonprofit organizations in Milwaukee, and conservative groups. It has been active in education reform including school choice, and efforts to change election rules. Approximately 70% of the foundation's giving is directed to national groups while 30% is Wisconsin-based.  The foundation had about $850 million in assets as of 2021.

History
The foundation was established in 1942, shortly after the death of Lynde Bradley, to further the philosophy of the Bradley brothers. The foundation's credo is "The good society is a free society."

In 1965, after the death of Harry Lynde Bradley, Lynde's brother, the foundation expanded and began to concentrate on public policy. The 1985 acquisition of the Allen-Bradley Company by Rockwell International Corporation resulted in a portion of the proceeds going to expand the foundation, swelling its assets from $14 million to over $290 million. In 1986, the foundation gave away $23 million, more than it had in the previous four decades.

The Bradley Foundation's former president, Michael S. Joyce, helped to create the Philanthropy Roundtable, a group of American philanthropists that, as of 2018, has 660 members (consisting of both individuals and organizations).

In August 2021 New Yorker magazine, Jane Mayer wrote that the Bradley Foundation "has become an extraordinary force in persuading mainstream Republicans to support radical challenges to election rules—a tactic once relegated to the far right" and "funds a network of groups that have been stoking fear about election fraud, in some cases for years. Public records show that, since 2012, the foundation has spent some eighteen million dollars supporting eleven conservative groups involved in election issues." On the foundation's board of directors is attorney Cleta Mitchell, who joined Donald Trump on his phone call on January 2, 2021, when he pressured Georgia election officials to find more than 11,000 votes to overturn the state's 2020 presidential election results.

Funding areas
The foundation describes itself as supporting limited government. The New York Times described the Bradley Foundation as "a leading source of ideas and financing for American conservatives." A 2013 report from the Center for Public Integrity found that the Bradley Foundation was a contributor to Donors Trust, a right-wing think tank has been described as the "dark money ATM" for conservative billionaires, enabling them to make sizable donations to conservative causes without attracting public scrutiny.

In a 2018 interview, the foundation's CEO, Richard Graber, described its four major areas of funding as "constitutional order", education (in particular school choice), civil society, and arts and culture. In that interview, Graber said that the foundation would deemphasize some areas in which it had previously made grants, including national security and foreign policy. Activities in these areas had funded millions of dollars for three anti-Muslim groups: the David Horowitz Freedom Center (which received $4.2 million), Frank Gaffney's Center for Security Policy (which received $815,000) and Daniel Pipes' Middle East Forum (which received $305,000). These grants were between 2008 and 2011. The foundation's funding was criticized by the Council on American-Islamic Relations, which described the grant recipients as an "Islamophobic network."

Organizations awarded grants by the foundation have included FreedomWorks, Americans for Prosperity, The Heritage Foundation, the Hoover Institution, the Black Alliance for Educational Options and the SEED Foundation.

Bradley Prize
The Bradley Prize is a grant to "formally recognize individuals of extraordinary talent and dedication who have made contributions of excellence in areas consistent with The Lynde and Harry Bradley Foundation's mission." As many as four prizes of $250,000 each are awarded annually. Winners  have included Fouad Ajami (2006), John Bolton (2007), Martin Feldstein (2007), Victor Davis Hanson (2008), Leonard Leo (2009), William Kristol (2009), Paul A. Gigot (2010), Jeb Bush (2011), Edwin Meese III (2012), Roger Ailes (2013), Paul Clement (2013), Mitch Daniels (2013), Yuval Levin (2013), Kimberly Strassel (2014), Ayaan Hirsi Ali (2015), James Ceaser (2015), Gary Sinise (2016), Peter Berkowitz (2017), Charles R. Kesler (2018), Roger Kimball (2019), Amity Shlaes (2021), and Glenn Loury (2022). 

Note: The Bradley Prizes for 2020 were canceled due to the coronavirus pandemic.

See also
 Argosy Foundation
 Bader Philanthropies
 Charter School Growth Fund
 Dark Money (book)
 Donors Trust
 Zilber Family Foundation

References

External links

Profile at Bloomberg Businessweek
 

Foundations based in the United States
Organizations based in Milwaukee
New Right (United States)
Conservative organizations in the United States
New Right organizations (United States)
Organizations established in 1942
1942 establishments in Wisconsin
Climate change denial
Uihlein Family